Lee Hyuk-jae (born on July 5, 1973) is a South Korean comedian.

Filmography

Television shows
 Road Show Quiz Expedition (KBS2, 2008–2009)

Awards and nominations

References

1973 births
Living people
South Korean male comedians
South Korean television presenters
People from Incheon
Inha University alumni